Üçüncü Mahmudlu is a village in the Fuzuli District of Azerbaijan. It was under the control of Armenian forces of the Nagorno-Karabakh, however, it was recaptured by the Azerbaijan Army on or around November 7, 2020.

References

External links 

Populated places in Fuzuli District